The first season of Eesti otsib superstaari started on March 11, 2007 and continued until June 14, 2007. It was won by Birgit Õigemeel. The show was hosted by Jüri Nael and Aigi Vahing. The judges were Mihkel Raud, Heidy Purga and Rein Rannap.

Auditions
Auditions were held in Tallinn, Tartu, Pärnu and Jõhvi in January 2007. The participation was allowed to everybody aged between 16 and 25. 2,500 people sang in auditions and only c. 100 were chosen by the judges to sing at the theatre round.

Theatre rounds
The theatre round took place in Eesti Nukuteater in Tallinn. After three rounds at the theatre round 32 young singers advanced to the semi-finals.

Semi-finals
The semifinals took place in April 2007. Four semifinals, plus a 'second chance' semi-final were held in TV3 studios. Eight singers who did not made it to the final were chosen by the judges to the second chance round. With a huge margin Luisa Värk won the televoting and qualified for the final. Others were eliminated.

Finals
Eight shows, plus eight Eesti otsib superstaari: Lava taga (Backstage) shows were aired during the finals.

Finalists
(Ages stated at time of contest)

Top 9: Song for a special person
 Rivo Kingi – "Fairytale Gone Bad" by Sunrise Avenue
 Nele Kirsipuu – "I'm Outta Love" by Anastacia
 Raimondo Laikre – "Back On The Road" by Earth, Wind & Fire
 Taavi Peterson – "Inimese loom" by Urmas Alender
 Mihkel Ratt – "Devils Daughter" by Silvertide
 Mariann Saar – "The Show Must Go On" by Queen
 Anna-Liisa Supp – "I Say A Little Prayer" by Aretha Franklin
 Luisa Värk – "You're the Inspiration" by Chicago
 Birgit Õigemeel – "Keegi tulla võib" by Rein Rannap

The bottom three: Mariann Saar, Rivo Kingi, Mihkel Ratt
The bottom two: Rivo Kingi, Mihkel Ratt
 Eliminated: Mihkel Ratt

Top 8: Film music
 Rivo Kingi – "Hero" by Chad Kroeger featuring Josey Scott from a film "Superman"
 Nele Kirsipuu – "I Don't Wanna Miss A Thing" by Aerosmith from a film "Armageddon"
 Raimondo Laikre – "Can You Feel The Love Tonight" by Elton John from a film "Lion King"
 Taavi Peterson – "Love Me Two Times" by The Doors from a film "The Doors"
 Mariann Saar – "Respect" by  Aretha Franklin from a film "Forrest Gump"
 Anna-Liisa Supp – "Listen" by Beyoncé from a film "Dreamgirls"
 Luisa Värk – "Son of a Preacher Man" by Dusty Springfield from a film "Pulp Fiction"
 Birgit Õigemeel – "Can't Fight the Moonlight" by LeAnn Rimes from a film "Coyote Ugly"

The bottom three: Nele Kirsipuu, Mariann Saar, Rivo Kingi  
The bottom two: Nele Kirsipuu, Mariann Saar
 Eliminated: Mariann Saar

Top 7: Estonian variety show music
 Rivo Kingi – "Julge laul" by Ivo Linna
 Nele Kirsipuu – "Rocca al Mare"
 Raimondo Laikre – "Mis värvi on armastus?" by Uno Loop
 Taavi Peterson – "Ilus oled isamaa" by Tõnis Mägi
 Anna-Liisa Supp – "Minu südames sa elad" by Jaak Joala
 Luisa Värk – "Naerjad vihmas" by Mait Maltis
 Birgit Õigemeel – "Kui mind kutsud sa" by Jaak Joala

The bottom two: Taavi Peterson, Nele Kirsipuu
 Eliminated: Nele Kirsipuu

Top 6: Judges choice
 Rivo Kingi – "Nothing Else Matters" by Metallica
 Raimondo Laikre – "Big Yellow Taxi" by Counting Crows
 Taavi Peterson – "Burning Down the House" by Talking Heads
 Anna-Liisa Supp – "Walking on Broken Glass" by Annie Lennox
 Luisa Värk – "Erase/Rewind" by Cardigans
 Birgit Õigemeel – "Everybody Hurts" by R.E.M.

The bottom two: Raimondo Laikre, Anna-Liisa Supp
 Eliminated: Anna-Liisa Supp

Top 5: Big Band round
 Rivo Kingi – "Sway" by Dean Martin
 Raimondo Laikre – "Ain't Misbehavin'" by Hank Williams, Jr.
 Taavi Peterson – "Route 66" composed by Bobby Troup
 Luisa Värk – "Don't Know Why" by Norah Jones
 Birgit Õigemeel – "Fever" by Little Willie John

The bottom two: Raimondo Laikre, Rivo Kingi
 Eliminated: Raimondo Laikre

Top 4: Country song & Billboard Hit 2007
 Rivo Kingi – "View from the Heaven" by Yellowcard
 Taavi Peterson – "Blowin' in the Wind" by Bob Dylan
 Luisa Värk – "I Will Remember You" by Sarah McLachlan
 Birgit Õigemeel – "Olen loobuda sust proovinud (Tryin' to Get Over You)" by Vince Gill
 Rivo Kingi – "Keep Your Hands Off My Girl" by Good Charlotte
 Taavi Peterson – "Ruby" by Kaiser Chiefs
 Luisa Värk – "All Good Things (Come to an End)" by Nelly Furtado
 Birgit Õigemeel – "Who Knew" by Pink

The bottom two: Rivo Kingi, Taavi Peterson
 Eliminated: Rivo Kingi

Top 3:Rock song & Duet
 Taavi Peterson – "Polly" by Nirvana
 Luisa Värk – "Ironic" by Alanis Morissette
 Birgit Õigemeel – "Bring Me to Life" by Evanescence and Paul McCoy
 Taavi Peterson with Ines – "Iseendale" by Ines
 Luisa Värk with Tanel Padar – "Lootusetus" by Tanel Padar & The Sun
 Birgit Õigemeel with Riho Sibul – "Ma sind ei tea (All by Myself)" by Eric Carmen

 Eliminated: Taavi Peterson

Superfinale: The Contestant's Favourite / People's Choice / Rein Rannap's Song
 Luisa Värk – "A Moment Like This" by Kelly Clarkson
 Birgit Õigemeel – "Bring Me to Life" by Evanescence and Paul McCoy
 Luisa Värk – "Earth Song" by Michael Jackson
 Birgit Õigemeel – "Impossible Dream" by Luther Vandross
 Luisa Värk – "Suudlus läbi jäätunud klaasi" by Rein Rannap
 Birgit Õigemeel – "Raagus sõnad" by Rein Rannap

Winner: Birgit Õigemeel

Runner-up: Luisa Värk

Elimination chart

After the season
The winner of the first season of Eesti otsib superstaari, Birgit Õigemeel, gave out her first single on November 12, 2007. The single was titled "Kas tead, mida tähendab…" (Do you know, what it means…).  The single reached second place in Radio 2 Year's Hit Awards. Her second single "365 Days" was released in January 2008. With this song Birgit competed in Estonian Eurovision Song Contest national final – Eurolaul and reached third. On January 25, 2008, her self-titled debut album was released by MTH Publishing. Her album reached the top of Estonian album charts for many weeks. Birgit also made a contract with charity fond Dharma. Birgit gives the charity fond 10 kroons for every sold copy of her album. From her debut album four singles were released. In Autumn 2008 Birgit took part of another TV3 reality show "Laulud tähtedega" (Songs with the Stars). Birgit and her 'star-singer', politician Margus Tsahkna, were the runner-up's.

The runner-up, Luisa Värk, also took part of the Eurovision Song Contest Estonian national final – Eurolaul 2008. With Margus Vaher she sand a song "God Inside Your Soul", which placed fifth. And with band traFFic she sang a song "It's Never Too Late" and placed 8th. She released her debut album on December 4, 2008. The album was named "Tunnete allee" (Avenue of Feelings).

Taavi Peterson, who reached the third place, went on a tour with one of the judges – Rein Rannap. As the winner and the runner-up, Taavi competed in Eurolaul 2008, with a song composed by Rein Rannap.

References

External links
 Official website (season 1)

Season 01
2000s Estonian television series
2007 Estonian television seasons